In automotive electronics, a door control unit (DCU) is a generic term for an embedded system that controls a number of electrical systems associated with an advanced motor vehicle. A modern motor vehicle contains a number of ECUs (electronic control units), and the door control unit (DCU) is one of the minor ones.

The door control unit is responsible for controlling and monitoring various electronic accessories in a vehicle's door. Since most of the vehicles have more than one door, DCUs may be present in each door separately, or a single centralised one provided. A DCU associated with the driver's door has some additional functionalities. This additional features are the result of complex functions like locking, driver door switch pad, child lock switches, etc., which are associated with the driver's door. In most of the cases driver door module acts as a master and others act as slaves in communication protocols.

Features controlled by Door Control Units 
 Manual window movements
 Automatic window movements
 Global Open-Close functionality
 Child lock safety feature
 Mirror folding
 Mirror adjustment
 Door lock and unlocking control (latches)
In some advanced motor vehicles, luxury features like puddle lamps and BLIS (Blind spot Indicator System) are also supported by DCUs.

Automotive electronics